David Ó Brácáin OCist  was a bishop in Ireland during the 13th-century.

The brother of Nehemias Ó Brácáin, his see was greatly reduced during his episcopate.  He died in 1267 and was buried at Mellifont Abbey.

References

13th-century Roman Catholic bishops in Ireland
Pre-Reformation bishops of Clogher
1267 deaths
Irish Cistercians